John Seabrook is an American writer.

He graduated from St. Andrew's School (DE) in 1976,  Princeton University in 1981 and received an M.A. in English Literature from Oxford. He began his career writing about business and published in a wide variety of magazines and newspapers, including Harper's, Vanity Fair, GQ, The Nation, The Village Voice, and the Christian Science Monitor. To date, he has published four books besides contributing numerous articles to The New Yorker. A  feature film based on his 2008 book Flash of Genius was released on October 3, 2008. His new book, The Song Machine: Inside the Hit Factory was published in October, 2015.

Bibliography

Books

Essays and reporting
 
 
 
 
 
 
 
  Tim Maia.

Critical studies and reviews of Seabrook's work
Nobrow
 
The song machine
 
———————
Notes

Notes

External links

Official Publisher's page for John Seabrook
Webpages dedicated to John Seabrook
Contributions to The New Yorker

The New Yorker people
The New Yorker staff writers
American music journalists
American technology journalists
Living people
Year of birth missing (living people)